Christophe Martin (born 21 February 1975) is a Belgian football goalkeeper who currently plays for R.F.C. Tournai. He started Mouscron's first four league matches of the 2006–07 season, but was back on the bench after their 3–1 defeat to K.S.K. Beveren on 26 August 2006.

Honours
With Mouscron:
Belgian Cup runners-up (2005–06)

External links
Stats.com profile

1975 births
Living people
Sportspeople from Tournai
Footballers from Hainaut (province)
Belgian footballers
Eredivisie players
Royal Excel Mouscron players
R.A.E.C. Mons players
Willem II (football club) players
Association football goalkeepers